Pioneer Football League, also known as the Bangladesh Pioneer Football League, is an  age-level league and also the sixth-tier of Bangladeshi football organised by Bangladesh Football Federation. The semi-finalsits of the competition are promoted to the Dhaka Third Division Football League. As the tournament is considered to be the lowest level of Bangladeshi football, so the number of participants is unlimited as well as any club is able to send an application to participate in the tournament.

History
The league unofficially started on 29 April 1980. A total of 160 teams participated in the qualifiers, from which 80 teams got a chance in the final stage. But the tournament was not registered as the Bangladesh Football Federation did not determine a champion and runner-up team. The Pioneer League officially started in 1981. In its first edition the league was inaugurated by the Speaker of the National Assembly (MNA), Shamsul Huda Chaudhury.

A year later, on September 24, 1983, the then FIFA President João Havelange inaugurated the league at the Dhaka Stadium. The next few editions saw the league being inaugurated by Prime Minister's Khaleda Zia and Sheikh Hasina.

Format

 A total of 46 teams were split into five zones - Central, East, West, North and South.
 The matches will be held at the five different venues- Paltan Outer Stadium, Gopibagh Brother Union ground, Mirpur Golartek ground, Uttara Sector 14 ground and Fatullah Aliganj ground. Each venue will host 2 groups.
 A total of 20 teams will play in the Super League, two from each zone. In the Super League, 20 teams will play in four groups.
 The four group champions will play the semi-finals. These four semi-finalists will advance to the Dhaka Third Division Football League.

Structure

Champions

Individual awards

Top-scorer

Player of the tournament

Player of the final

References

3
Sport in Dhaka
1983 establishments in Bangladesh
Youth football leagues
Sixth level football leagues in Asia
Sports leagues established in 1983